The urine anion gap is calculated using measured ions found in the urine. It is used to aid in the differential diagnosis of metabolic acidosis.

The term "anion gap" without qualification usually implies serum anion gap. The "urine anion gap" is a different measure, principally used to determine whether the kidneys are capable of appropriately acidifying urine.

Calculation
Urine anion gap is calculated by subtracting the urine concentration of chloride (anions) from the concentrations of sodium plus potassium (cations):

 = Na+ + K+ − Cl−

where the concentrations are expressed in units of milliequivalents/liter (mEq/L).

In contrast to the serum anion gap equation, the bicarbonate is excluded. This is because urine is acidic, so the bicarbonate level would be negligible.

Uses
Determining the cause of a metabolic acidosis that lacks a serum anion gap often depends on determining whether the kidney is appropriately excreting acid. The urine anion gap is an 'artificial' and calculated measure that is representative of the unmeasured ions in urine. Usually the most important unmeasured ion in urine is NH4+ since it is the most important form of acid excretion by the kidney.  Urine NH4+ is difficult to measure directly, but its excretion is usually accompanied by the anion chloride. A negative urine anion gap can be used as evidence of increased NH4+ excretion.  In a metabolic acidosis without a serum anion gap:
 A positive urine anion gap suggests a low urinary NH4+ (e.g. renal tubular acidosis).
 A negative urine anion gap suggests a high urinary NH4+ (e.g. diarrhea).

References

Urine